Catastalsis is the rhythmic contraction and relaxation of the muscle of the intestines. It resembles ordinary peristalsis but is not preceded by a wave of inhibition.

References 

Digestive system